The Climate Dress was designed in 2009 by Danish design company Diffus Design in collaboration with the Swiss embroidery company Forster-Rohner, the Alexandra Institute and the Danish School of Design.

The Climate Dress is laced with hundreds of light-emitting diodes (LEDs) that responds to the level of carbon dioxide (CO2) in the nearby surroundings and are powered through the conductive embroidery by an Arduino Lily pad microprocessor and a carbon dioxide detector, resulting in patterns that range from slow pulses to rapid flashes depending on the concentration of the CO2. The Climate Dress does not rely on wiring, soldering, or crimping, which is often the case with smart textile products. All functional elements are blended into the embroidery and exposed to the viewer.

The Climate Dress was presented at the Cop 15 Climate Summit in Copenhagen in 2009, at the "Health Environment Climate" exhibition.

In 2011 the Climate Dress won first prize in the Design That Performs contest, hosted by Samsung.

See also
 List of individual dresses

References 

Technical fabrics
2009 in fashion
2009 in technology
Individual dresses
2009 works
Black dresses